The Lost Mind of Dr. Brain is the third installment of the original Dr. Brain series, which were educational games published by Sierra On-Line. There were four games in the original series and four sequel games.

Gameplay

Similar to the first two games in the series, The Lost Mind of Dr. Brain features science related puzzles. Previous installments featured a large, semi-free-roaming environment, however The Lost Mind of Dr. Brain restricts the player to a single area (Dr. Brain's laboratory), with puzzles accessed from a central 'map' screen. Dr. Brain's niece, Elaina (voiced by Kayce Glasse) replaces Dr. Brain as host and serves as a guide to Dr. Brain's mental pathways. While the previous games' puzzles ranged across a variety of disciplines (both Castle and Island contained memory and word puzzles, as well as puzzles related to art and the sciences), The Lost Mind of Dr. Brain focuses solely on the human brain, with puzzles related to spatial orientation, memorization, and symbolic association.

Reception

The game was reviewed positively by Computer Shopper as entertaining in August 1995 and by PC Gamer for having "educational value" in December 1996.

Next Generation reviewed the Macintosh version of the game, rating it three stars out of five, and stated that "If you have (or are) a little kid, definitely try this out; if not, have six or eight drinks and try it out anyway. At worst, you'll be drunk and watching cartoons."

References

External links

1995 video games
Children's educational video games
Coktel Vision games
Classic Mac OS games
Puzzle video games
Sierra Discovery games
Sierra Entertainment games
Video game sequels
Windows games
Video games developed in the United States